Lady Tubbs is a 1935 American comedy film directed by Alan Crosland and written by Barry Trivers. The film stars Alice Brady, Douglass Montgomery, Anita Louise, Alan Mowbray, June Clayworth and Hedda Hopper. The film was released on July 2, 1935, by Universal Pictures.

Plot

Cast  
Alice Brady as Henrietta Tubbs
Douglass Montgomery as Phil Ash-Orcutt
Anita Louise as Wynne Howard
Alan Mowbray as Elyot Wembsleigh
June Clayworth as Jean LaGendre
Hedda Hopper as Mrs. Ronald Ash-Orcutt
Russell Hicks as Mr. Ronald Ash-Orcutt
Lumsden Hare as Lord Abernathy
Virginia Hammond as Lady Abernathy
Minor Watson as Edward J. Fishbaker
Rafael Storm as Rinaldo

References

External links 
 

1935 films
American comedy films
1935 comedy films
Universal Pictures films
Films directed by Alan Crosland
American black-and-white films
1930s English-language films
1930s American films